Kal Ahmadi (also Romanized as Kal Aḩmadī) is a village in Abolfares Rural District, in the Central District of Ramhormoz County, Khuzestan Province, Iran. At the 2006 census, its population was 301, in 60 families.

References 

Populated places in Ramhormoz County